Strikeforce: Rockhold vs. Kennedy was a mixed martial arts event held by Strikeforce. The event took place on July 14, 2012 at the Rose Garden in Portland, Oregon.

Results

References

Rockhold vs. Kennedy
2012 in mixed martial arts
Mixed martial arts in Oregon
Sports in Portland, Oregon
2012 in sports in Oregon
Events in Portland, Oregon